Alexandre, Baron Lamfalussy (26 April 1929 – 9 May 2015) was a Hungarian-born Belgian economist who served as President of the European Monetary Institute (EMI) from 1994 to 1997, which was the forerunner to the European Central Bank (ECB).

Born in Kapuvár, Hungary, Lamfalussy left his native country in 1949. He studied at the Catholic University of Leuven and Nuffield College, Oxford, where he received his doctorate in economics. He later taught at the University of Louvain (UCLouvain) and Yale.

In 1963 he was among the founders of SUERF – an association originally set up as a group to promote financial research among academics, and served as the Association's first Honorary Treasurer. In honour of his contribution to European monetary and financial issues, he was made an honorary member of SUERF at the association's 40th anniversary meeting held at the Banque de France in Paris. 

From 1976 he was an economic adviser to the Bank for International Settlements in Basel and held the post of assistant general manager from 1981 to 1985. He was then general director of the bank, where he remained until 1993.

From 1994 to 1997 he was founding president of the European Monetary Institute in Frankfurt, forerunner to the European Central Bank. 

From 2000 to 2001 he chaired the Committee of Wise Men on the Regulation of European Securities Markets, whose proposals were adopted by the Council of the European Union in March 2001. As chair of the committee, he oversaw the creation of the Lamfalussy process, an approach to the development of financial service industry regulation used most famously in MiFID -  the Markets in Financial Instruments Directive. 
In 2013 he was decorated with Hungary's highest decoration, the Hungarian Order of Saint Stephen. He died on 9 May 2015 in Ottignies, Belgium.

References

External links

|-

1929 births
2015 deaths
Alumni of Nuffield College, Oxford
Knights Commander of the Order of Merit of the Federal Republic of Germany
Belgian economists
Hungarian economists